This is a list of diplomatic missions in Burundi.  At present, the former capital city of Bujumbura hosts 20 embassies.

Embassies

Other representations 
 (Delegation)
 (Cooperation office & consular agency)
 (Embassy liaison office)

Non-resident embassies accredited to Burundi
In Nairobi except as noted

See also 
 Foreign relations of Burundi

References

External links
 Listing of embassies

List
Burundi
Diplomatic missions